Janowice  is a village in the administrative district of Gmina Sompolno, within Konin County, Greater Poland Voivodeship, in west-central Poland. The village held the world record for the biggest car parking space until 1992.

References

Janowice